The 1926 Oklahoma Sooners football team represented the University of Oklahoma in the 1926 college football season. In their 22nd year under head coach Bennie Owen, the Sooners compiled a 5–2–1 record (3–2–1 against conference opponents), finished in fifth place in the Missouri Valley Conference, and outscored their opponents by a combined total of 137 to 52.

No Sooners were recognized as All-Americans, but three Sooners received all-conference honors: end Roy LeCrone; back Frank Potts; and center Polly Wallace.

Schedule

References

Oklahoma
Oklahoma Sooners football seasons
Oklahoma Sooners football